Hans Enoksen (born 7 August 1956) is a Greenlandic politician who served as the third prime minister of Greenland from 2002 to 2009.

A Greenlandic monoglot, he has been a member of the Parliament of Greenland since 1995. He became Minister for Fisheries, Hunting and Settlements and chairman of the political party Siumut in 2001.

He was elected prime minister on 14 December 2002, his party winning a mere 28%, a 7% drop from the previous election in 1999, but still enough to win.

After his election he began an alliance with left wing party Inuit Ataqatigiit. The two parties began discussing how to change the agreement with Denmark and the U.S. about how much Greenland should receive in compensation for the U.S. airbase situated outside the town of Thule, in the north of the country.  In the 2009 election, the IA beat him with 43% of the vote compared to Enoksen's party's 26%.

After the 2009 defeat, Hans Enoksen retired as leader of Siumut.

At the elections 2013 he was re-elected, but in January 2014 he was so unsatisfied with Siumut′s politics that he left the party and established a new political party, Partii Naleraq. The new party won 11.6% of the valid votes at the elections on 28 November 2014, and got three members elected for the Greenlandic parliament. Enoksen got 2,425 personal votes.

He was Speaker of the Inatsisartut in 2018.

References

1956 births
Greenlandic Inuit people
Living people
People from Qeqqata
Naleraq politicians
Siumut politicians
Chairmen of the Parliament of Greenland
Prime Ministers of Greenland
Energy ministers of Greenland
Fisheries ministers of Greenland
Industry ministers of Greenland
Trade ministers of Greenland
Recipients of Nersornaat